The Shreveport Steamer were a professional American football team in the World Football League. The franchise began the 1974 season in Houston, Texas, as the Houston Texans (no connection to the current NFL team of the same name), playing their home games at the Houston Astrodome. Toward the end of the season, the team relocated to Shreveport, Louisiana, and became the Shreveport Steamer. They played at the 30,000-seat State Fair Stadium, now named Independence Stadium.  Larry King, of future CNN fame, was one of their broadcasters.

The Steamer showcased a number of veterans and a few rookies.  Among them were ambidextrous quarterback and former University of Houston star D. C. Nobles and several American Football League veterans: quarterbacks Mike Taliaferro and Don Trull, fullback Jim Nance, wide receivers Don Maynard and Rick Eber, tight end Willie Frazier, former Houston Oiler and All-AFL tackle Glen Ray Hines, linebacker Garland Boyette, defensive end Al Dotson, defensive backs Daryl Johnson, Richmond Flowers, Jr., John Mallory, and Art McMahon, and rookie linebacker John Villapiano, brother of Oakland Raiders defender Phil Villapiano.

History

1974 season
The Texans played in Houston for 11 games, going 3-7-1. The team relocated to Shreveport on September 18, 1974. On September 23, 1974, they were rechristened the Shreveport Steamer.  The franchise, according to the WFL, was operated on a "play now, pay later" basis. The team was coached by Marshall Taylor, a former star player at Tennessee Tech. The Steamer made their home debut on September 25 against the Memphis Southmen. They played in front of just over 21,000 fans, and lost 17-3. They had a 4-5 record after the move, finishing 7-12-1 overall in 1974.

In 1974, under federal court order, Sheriff James M. Goslin seized equipment of the Charlotte Hornets, who were in Shreveport playing at Independence Stadium for the WFL against the Shreveport Steamer. Goslin was complying with a suit seeking more than $26,000 in accumulated debts that had been filed against the Hornets by plaintiffs in New York, where the team had been domiciled during the first half of 1974.  However, Goslin allowed the Hornets to play the Steamer before the impounding of the equipment.

1975 season
The Steamer returned for the 1975 WFL season with a different coaching staff.  Right from the start, both the "Boats" and the resurrected league struggled.  (The second Chicago franchise, the Chicago Winds, unrelated except by venue to the previous year's Chicago team, the Chicago Fire, ceased operations on September 2, after five games.)  After a mediocre 5-7 record and with the franchise almost out of money, the Steamer and the WFL sank permanently on October 22, 1975.  The second WFL ceased operations little more than halfway through the planned 1975 season.

An unrelated "Shreveport Steamer", also known as the plural "Steamers", played in the American Football Association from 1979 to 1981. (All copyrights and trademarks for the WFL's teams were allowed to lapse after the league's shutdown.) This team renamed itself the "Steamers-Americans" after merging with the Orlando Americans in 1982. Billy Kilmer served as the team's coach in its first season.

Schedule and results

1974 regular season 

† first game after announcing move to Shreveport
‡ first home game in Shreveport

1975 regular season

See also
 1974 World Football League season
 1975 World Football League season

Sources
Houston Texans 1974 WFL Media Guide
Shreveport Steamer 1975 WFL Media Guide

References

 
Defunct American football teams
1974 establishments in Texas
1975 disestablishments in Louisiana
American football teams in Louisiana